Aleksandr Krovetskiy (born 2 October 1996) is a Belarusian professional footballer.

References

External links 
 
 

1996 births
Living people
Belarusian footballers
Association football forwards
FC Naftan Novopolotsk players
FC Orsha players